Charles Patin (23 February 1633 - 10 October 1693) was a French physician and numismatist. He was the son of Guy Patin, dean of the school of medicine in Paris, and a friend of Jacob Spon. Trained first by his father, he obtained a law degree and then chose to study medicine. He became best known for his numismatic work. He married the moralist author Madeleine Patin: their daughter Gabrielle-Charlotte Patin became a painter and numismatist, and their daughter Charlotte-Catherine Patin became a writer.

External links
 

1633 births
1693 deaths
17th-century French writers
17th-century French male writers
17th-century French physicians
French medical writers
French numismatists
Writers from Paris
French male non-fiction writers